1980 in sports describes the year's events in world sport.

Alpine skiing
 Alpine Skiing World Cup:
 Men's overall season champion: Andreas Wenzel, Liechtenstein
 Women's overall season champion: Hanni Wenzel, Liechtenstein
 January 12 – Canada's Ken Read, the leader of the "Crazy Canucks" ski team, wins the Hahnenkamm downhill in Kitzbühel, Austria, becoming the second North American to ever win the classic race.

American football
 January 20 − Super Bowl XIV: the Pittsburgh Steelers (AFC) won 31–19 over the Los Angeles Rams (NFC)
 Location: Rose Bowl
 Attendance: 103,985
 MVP: Terry Bradshaw, QB (Pittsburgh) 
 Sugar Bowl (1979 season):
 The Alabama Crimson Tide won 24–9 over the Arkansas Razorbacks to claim the college football national championship
 December 21: The New Orleans Saints became the NFL's first ever 1-15 team

Association football
 European Championship – West Germany 2–1 Belgium
 European Cup – Nottingham Forest 1–0 Hamburg
 UEFA Cup – 2 legs, Borussia Mönchengladbach 3–2 Eintracht Frankfurt; Eintracht Frankfurt 1–0 Borussia Mönchengladbach, 3–3 on aggregate, Frankfurt win on away goals
 Cup Winners' Cup – Valencia 0–0 Arsenal (AET), Valencia won 5–4 on penalties
 England – FA Cup – West Ham United won 1–0 over Arsenal
 Newport County AFC win Welsh Cup for first time.

Athletics
 March 31 – death of Jesse Owens, American sprinter who won four gold medals at the Berlin Olympics in 1936
 June 12 – Soviet Union's Nadiya Olizarenko sets the world record in the women's 800 metres, clocking 1:54.85 at Moscow
 July 27 – Nadiya Olizarenko betters her own world record in the women's 800 metres at the 1980 Summer Olympics in Moscow, clocking 1:53.43.

Australian rules football
 Victorian Football League
 Richmond wins the 84th VFL Premiership (Richmond 23.21 (159) d Collingwood 9.24 (78))
 Brownlow Medal awarded to Kelvin Templeton (Footscray)

Baseball
 September 18 – Outfielder Gary Ward become the sixth Minnesota Twins player to hit for the cycle. The Twins lose 9–8 to the Milwaukee Brewers, wasting Ward's effort. On  May 26, 2004 his son, Daryle Ward, will repeat the feat guiding the Pirates' 11–8 victory over the Cardinals. Ward joined his father to become the first father-son combination in major league history to hit for the cycle.
 Rollie Fingers breaks Hoyt Wilhelm's major league record of 250 saves
 1980 World Series – The Philadelphia Phillies of the National League end 97 years of frustration by defeating the American League champion Kansas City Royals four games to two, for the Phillies' first-ever World Championship.
 Japan's Sadaharu Oh retires from the Yomiuri Giants as the all time professional baseball home run king.

Basketball
NBA Finals 
Los Angeles Lakers win four games to two over the Philadelphia 76ers

National Basketball League (Australia) Finals
St. Kilda Saints defeated the West Adelaide Bearcats 113–88 in the final.

Boxing
 March 14–22 members of the United States Olympic boxing team died in a plane crash near Warsaw, Poland
 June 20- Roberto Durán defeats Sugar Ray Leonard by a 15-round decision to win boxing's WBC world Welterweight title.
 August 2- Thomas Hearns defeats José "Pipino" Cuevas by a knockout in round 2 to win boxing's WBA world Welterweight title and Yasutsune Uehara knocks out Samuel Serrano in round six to win the WBA's world Jr. Lightweight title in Detroit
 In Cincinnati, Aaron Pryor defeats Antonio Cervantes by a knockout in round four to win the WBA's world Jr. Welterweight title.
 October 2- Larry Holmes defeats Muhammad Ali by a knockout in round eleven to retain boxing's WBC world Heavyweight title, in what would be Ali's last world title bout.
 November 25- In The No Más Fight, in New Orleans, Louisiana, Sugar Ray Leonard recovers the WBC's world Welterweight championship with an eight-round technical knockout of Roberto Durán.

Canadian football
 Grey Cup – Edmonton Eskimos win 48–10 over the Hamilton Tiger-Cats
 Vanier Cup – Alberta Golden Bears win 40–21 over the Ottawa Gee-Gees

Cycling
 Giro d'Italia won by Bernard Hinault of France
 Tour de France – Joop Zoetemelk of the Netherlands
 UCI Road World Championships – Men's road race – Bernard Hinault of France

Disc sports
 Disc ultimate league play begins in Toronto with the formation of the Toronto Ultimate League

Dog sledding
 Iditarod Trail Sled Dog Race Champion –
 Joe May won with lead dogs: Wilbur & Cora Gray

Field hockey
 Men's Champions Trophy held in Karachi and won by Pakistan
 Olympic Games (Men's Competition) won by India
 Olympic Games (Women's Competition) won by Zimbabwe

Figure skating
 World Figure Skating Championships –
 Men's champion: Jan Hoffmann, Germany
 Ladies' champion: Anett Pötzsch, Germany
 Pair skating champions: Marina Cherkasova & Sergei Shakhrai, Soviet Union
 Ice dancing champions: Krisztina Regőczy & András Sallay, Hungary

Gaelic Athletic Association
 Camogie
 All-Ireland Camogie Champion: Cork
 National Camogie League: Kilkenny
 Gaelic football
 All-Ireland Senior Football Championship – Kerry 1–9 died Roscommon 1–6
 National Football League – Cork 0–11 died Kerry 0–10
 Ladies' Gaelic football
 All-Ireland Senior Football Champion: Tipperary
 National Football League: Kerry
 Hurling
 All-Ireland Senior Hurling Championship – Galway 2–15 died Limerick 3–9
 National Hurling League – Cork 2–10 4–15 beat Limerick 2–10 4–6

Golf
Men's professional
 The Senior PGA Tour (now called Champions Tour) is founded.
 Masters Tournament – Seve Ballesteros
 U.S. Open – Jack Nicklaus
 British Open – Tom Watson
 PGA Championship – Jack Nicklaus
 PGA Tour money leader – Tom Watson – $530,808
 Senior PGA Tour – money leader – Don January – $44,100
Men's amateur
 British Amateur – Duncan Evans
 U.S. Amateur – Hal Sutton
Women's professional
 LPGA Championship – Sally Little
 U.S. Women's Open – Amy Alcott
 Classique Peter Jackson Classic – Pat Bradley
 LPGA Tour money leader – Beth Daniel – $231,000

Harness racing
 Superhorse, Niatross wins the United States Pacing Triple Crown races –
 Cane Pace – Niatross
 Little Brown Jug – Niatross
 Messenger Stakes – Niatross
 United States Trotting Triple Crown races –
 Hambletonian – Burgomeister 
 Yonkers Trot – Nevele Impulse
 Kentucky Futurity – Final Score
 Australian Inter Dominion Harness Racing Championship –
 Pacers: Koala King
 Trotters: Hano Direct

Horse racing
Steeplechases
 Cheltenham Gold Cup – Master Smudge
 Grand National – Ben Nevis
Flat races
 Australia – Melbourne Cup won by Beldale Ball
 Canada – Queen's Plate won by Driving Home
 France – Prix de l'Arc de Triomphe won by Detroit
 Ireland – Irish Derby Stakes won by Tyrnavos
 English Triple Crown Races:
 2,000 Guineas Stakes – Known Fact
 The Derby – Henbit
 St. Leger Stakes – Light Cavalry
 United States Triple Crown Races:
 Kentucky Derby – Genuine Risk
 Preakness Stakes – Codex
 Belmont Stakes – Temperance Hill

Ice hockey
New York Islanders win Stanley Cup on Bobby Nystrom's overtime goal in Game 6 of the Finals over the Philadelphia Flyers.
The United States men's ice hockey team defeats the Soviet Union en route to the gold medal in what is known as the Miracle on Ice.

Motorsport

Olympic Games
 1980 Summer Olympics takes place in Moscow, USSR (July 19 - August 3)
 USSR wins the most medals (195), and the most gold medals (80).
 1980 Winter Olympics takes place in Lake Placid, United States (February 13 - February 24)
 GDR wins the most medals (23), and the USSR wins the most gold medals (10).

Radiosport
 First Amateur Radio Direction Finding World Championships held in Cetniewo, Poland.

Rugby league
 8 July – The inaugural 1980 State of Origin game is won by Queensland who defeat New South Wales 20–10 at Lang Park
1980 European Rugby League Championship
1980 New Zealand rugby league season
1979–80 Northern Rugby Football League season
1980 NSWRFL season
1980–81 Rugby Football League season
1980 Tooth Cup

Rugby union
 86th Five Nations Championship series is won by England who complete the Grand Slam

Snooker
 World Snooker Championship – Cliff Thorburn beats Alex Higgins 18–16, becoming the first non-UK player to win the title
 World rankings – Ray Reardon remains world number one for 1980/81

Speed skating
 February 19 - Eric Heiden skates Olympics record 1000 meter in 1 15.18

Swimming
 XXII Olympic Games, held in Moscow, Soviet Union (July 20 – July 27)
 February 2 – USA's Chris Cavanaugh sets a world record in the 50m freestyle (long course) at a swimming meet in Amersfoort, Netherlands, shaving off 0.04 of the previous record (23.70) set by Germany's Klaus Steinbach nearly a year ago: 23.66.
 April 10 – Chris Cavanaugh betters his own world record in the 50m freestyle (long course) at a swimming meet in Austin, Texas (USA): 23.12. At the same event (and on the same day), two other swimmers from the United States, Rowdy Gaines and Bruce Stahl, go under his time, clocking 22.96 and 22.83 respectively.
 August 15 – USA's Joe Bottom betters the world record in the 50m freestyle (long course) at a meet in Honolulu, Hawaii, shaving off 0.12 of the previous record (22.83) set by Bruce Stahl four months earlier: 22.71.

Tennis
 April 16 - Arthur Ashe retires from professional tennis
 Grand Slam in tennis men's results:
 Australian Open – Brian Teacher
 French Open – Björn Borg
 Wimbledon championships – Björn Borg
 U.S. Open – John McEnroe
 Grand Slam in tennis women's results:
 Australian Open – Hana Mandlíková
 French Open – Chris Evert
 Wimbledon championships – Evonne Goolagong Cawley
 U.S. Open – Chris Evert
 Davis Cup World tennis – Czechoslovakia defeated Italy 4–1.

Water polo
 Water polo at the 1980 Summer Olympics won by USSR

Yacht racing
 The New York Yacht Club retains the America's Cup as Freedom defeats challenger Australia, of the Royal Perth Yacht Club, 4 races to 1

Awards
 ABC's Wide World of Sports Athlete of the Year: U.S. Olympic Hockey Team
 Associated Press Male Athlete of the Year – U.S. Olympic hockey team, Amateur Ice Hockey
 Associated Press Female Athlete of the Year – Chris Evert, Tennis

References

 
Sports by year